The Columns of Gediminas or Pillars of Gediminas ('Columns') are one of the earliest symbols of Lithuania and its historical coats of arms. They were used in the Grand Duchy of Lithuania, initially as a rulers' personal insignia, a state symbol, and later as a part of heraldic signs of leading aristocracy.

Appearance

The symbol appears in the following form: Horizontal line at bottom, vertical lines extend up at both ends. The square at the middle of the horizontal line is about half as tall as the vertical lines. Another vertical line rises from the top center of the square, giving an overall appearance that is close to a trident. This form is the one usually seen in modern times, often drawn on walls and fences as protest against the Soviet occupation of Lithuania.

It is notable that the ancient pre-Christian symbols of Lithuania did not follow the same strict rules of heraldry as their western counterparts. Thus this symbol was used in or and argent, usually on the field gules, and was depicted in various shapes on flags, banners and shields.

Some Belarusian historians claim that the Columns directly go back to the symbol of the Rurikids, which was the trident.

Name

The name "Columns of Gediminas" was given in the 19th century by historian Teodor Narbutt, who supposed that the symbol was Gediminas' insignia. The more exact name of the symbol is the Pillars of Gediminids, since there is no direct evidence of its connection with Grand Duke of Lithuania Gediminas.

History

In the Grand Duchy of Lithuania 
According to the historical and archaeological evidence, the Columns were used by Grand Duke of Lithuania and Duke of Trakai Kęstutis. They appear on the Lithuanian coins issued by him. The symbol was also used by Vytautas as his personal insignia since 1397 and appeared on his seal and coins. It was suggested by historian Edmundas Antanas Rimša, who analyzed the ancient coins, that the Columns of the Gediminids symbolizes the Gates of the Trakai Peninsula Castle. According to the accounts of Jan Długosz, it was derived from a symbol or brand used to mark horses and other property. The Columns were adopted by descendants of Kęstutis as their family symbol, equivalent to a coat of arms. Another user of the Columns of Gediminas was Grand Duke of Lithuania Sigismund Kęstutaitis. At first, the Columns signified the family of Kęstutis, in contrast to the Vytis which was used by Algirdas' descendants. Later on, as a symbol of a ruling dynasty, it was adopted by Jagiellons and the two symbols became state symbols of the Grand Duchy of Lithuania and the Columns of Gediminas remained in use over the following centuries.

In the Interwar Republic of Lithuania 
During the period between World War I and World War II they were used by the Lithuanian Republic as a minor state symbol, e. g. on Litas coins and military equipment. The Columns of Gediminas are featured on the Lithuanian Presidential award Order of the Lithuanian Grand Duke Gediminas, that was started in 1928.

In the Soviet Union 
After the annexation of Lithuania by the Soviet Union, the symbol was officially banned. During the Singing Revolution of the late 80s, it became the iconic sign of the reform movement Sąjūdis.

Modern usage in Lithuania 
The Columns of Gediminas appears in the coat of arms of Seimas and in the emblems of the Lithuanian Armed Forces, Land Force, Air Force, Navy, Military Police, National Defence Volunteer Forces and Grand Duke Gediminas Staff Battalion. The Columns of Gediminas are also featured in the coat of arms of Old Trakai, Trakai District Municipality and Šimkaičiai. The symbol is also used on many monuments throughout the country.

The official logo of the EuroBasket 2011, which took place in Lithuania, is composed of the Columns overlaid on a basketball board.

The Columns of Gediminas are also the official logo of the Lithuanian postal company - Lietuvos paštas. The company uses the columns on its official stamps.

A combition of Columns of Gediminas and the Menorah are used by the Litvak community as a symbol meant to identify Lithuanian Jews with content expressing the history of the Jews in Lithuania.

Usage in Belarus 
In modern Belarus, the columns of Gediminas, alongside the Pahonia, are occasionally used as a symbol of national pride.

The columns of Gediminas are in the coat of arms of Brahin in southeastern Belarus.

The symbol is featured on the monument to the Grand Duke Gediminas in Lida. which was unveiled in 2019.

Usage in Ukraine 
In Ukraine, the coat of arms of Zhytomyr Oblast adopted an archaic form of the Vytis (Pohonia) on the top-right shield, with the knight's shield containing the columns of Gediminas.

After Russia started an invasion of Ukraine in 2022, the Pahonia Regiment was formed as part of the International Legion of Territorial Defence of Ukraine, which used the Columns of Gediminas on their emblem.

In art 
The Columns of Gediminas are displayed to the left of Jogaila in one of Jan Matejko's best-known portraits, although Jogaila's personal insignia was a double cross.

See also 

 Coat of arms of Lithuania
Gediminas' Tower
House of Gediminas
 Polish heraldry
 Symbols of the Rurikids
 Tamga

References

Sources
 Valstybė. Iliustruota Lietuvos enciklopedija
"Gediminas' Columns". Encyclopedia Lituanica II: 293. (1970–1978). Ed. Simas Sužiedėlis. Boston, Massachusetts: Juozas Kapočius. LCCN 74–114275.

National symbols of Lithuania
Heraldic charges